Winzapper is a freeware utility / hacking tool used to delete events from the Microsoft Windows NT 4.0 and Windows 2000 Security Log. It was developed by Arne Vidstrom as a proof-of-concept tool, demonstrating that once the Administrator account has been compromised, event logs are no longer reliable. According to Hacking Exposed: Windows Server 2003, Winzapper works with Windows NT/2000/2003.

Prior to Winzapper's creation, Administrators already had the ability to clear the Security log either through the Event Viewer or through third-party tools such as Clearlogs. However, Windows lacked any built-in method of selectively deleting events from the Security Log. An unexpected clearing of the log would likely be a red flag to system administrators that an intrusion had occurred. Winzapper would allow a hacker to hide the intrusion by deleting only those log events relevant to the attack. Winzapper, as publicly released, lacked the ability to be run remotely without the use of a tool such as Terminal Services. However, according to Arne Vidstrom, it could easily be modified for remote operation.

There is also an unrelated trojan horse by the same name.

Countermeasures
Winzapper creates a backup security log, "dummy.dat," at %systemroot%\system32\config. This file may be undeleted after an attack to recover the original log. Conceivably, however, a savvy user might copy a sufficiently large file over the dummy.dat file and thus irretrievably overwrite it. Winzapper causes the Event Viewer to become unusable until after a reboot, so an unexpected reboot may be a clue that Winzapper has recently been used. Another potential clue to a Winzapper-based attempt would be corruption of the Security Log (requiring it to be cleared), since there is always a small risk that Winzapper will do this.

According to WindowsNetworking.com, "One way to prevent rogue admins from using this tool on your servers is to implement a Software Restriction Policy using Group Policy that prevents the WinZapper executable from running".

References

Computer security software